WRKA (103.9 FM) is a commercial urban adult contemporary radio station licensed to serve Louisville, Kentucky. Owned by SummitMedia, the station covers the Louisville metropolitan area.  The WRKA studios are located in Downtown Louisville, while the transmitter site resides atop the National City Tower. Besides a standard analog transmission, WRKA is available online.

History
In November 1974, the station signed on the air as WFIA-FM, an FM adjunct to WFIA and owned by AM 900, Inc. The call sign was later changed to WXLN and played Contemporary Christian music.

The station's first post Christian format was contemporary hit radio as WZKS "Kiss 104". Debuting on July 5, 1990, WZKS intended to challenge WDJX, but after WDJX's owners entered into a local marketing agreement to operate the station on January 27, 1992, WZKS simulcast WDJX for nearly a month and a half. After the simulcast broke that March 19, WZKS began stunting by playing songs recorded by Garth Brooks, then switched to country music on March 23.

During this period, 103.9 became the first FM station in the market intended to challenge longtime country leader WAMZ. Initially, 103.9 was known as "Hot Country 103.9", which, unlike WAMZ, had no local air talent, instead relying on Westwood One's "Hot Country" format. On March 30, 1993, the station was revamped as "103.9 The Hawk", added local programming, and changed its call sign to WHKW.

The format, call letters, and "The Hawk" branding were transferred to WKJK (107.7 FM) on May 24, 1994. After that programming move, WHKW adopted an oldies format branded as "Cool 103.9", with replacement WQLL calls on June 6. The playlist was changed to all 1970's music, but the "Cool" branding was retained.

The station changed its format to Smooth Jazz on June 3, 1996, and changed its call letters to WSJW. On August 7, 1998, the station changed again to adult contemporary as WMHX "Mix 103.9", reviving a format dropped by the former WLRS a year earlier.

After the station was purchased by Cox Radio in 1999, WHMX switched to an all-80s hits format branded as "103.9 The Point" in November 2000. The call letters were switched to WPTK on November 24, then a month later, on December 20, to WPTI. WPTI dropped the 80s hits format for another attempt at country, branded "New Country 103.9", on October 21, 2004. WPTI's call letters were changed to WRKA on July 18, 2008, and the format was changed to Classic Country as "Country Legends 103.9" that July 23. The previous country format was moved to the former WRKA, renamed WQNU.

Cox Radio, Inc. sold WRKA, along with 22 other stations, to Summit Media LLC for $66.25 million on July 20, 2012; the sale was consummated on May 3, 2013.

On May 23, 2014, WRKA began stunting by only playing music by Garth Brooks as "103.9 Garth-FM" before announcing the station was not able to use Brooks' name due to what they claimed was "legal issues".  It rebranded as "XXXXX-FM" (with the "XXXXX" being pronounced on-air as a long beep) and promising a new format to debut the following Monday, June 2, at 7 am. At that time, WRKA relaunched with a 1990s-heavy country format, once again branded as "103.9 The Hawk". The first song on "The Hawk" was Gone Country by Alan Jackson.

On December 31, 2018, WRKA dropped the classic country format and began stunting as "103.9 The Party" using the slogan, "Where it's New Year's Eve every day." On January 14, 2019, at 9 a.m., WRKA flipped to rhythmic adult contemporary, branded as "103.9 The Groove". In January 2020, WRKA shifted to urban adult contemporary, still under the "Groove" branding.

References

External links

Urban adult contemporary radio stations in the United States
RKA
Radio stations established in 1974
1974 establishments in Kentucky